Hans Jürgen Wenzel (4 March 1939 – 8 August 2009) was a German conductor and composer.

Life 
Born in Weißwasser, Wenzel first received a violin education at the University of Rostock. From 1957 to 1962 he studied conducting and musical composition with Ruth Zechlin at the Hochschule für Musik "Hanns Eisler" in Berlin.

From 1962 to 1965 he was ballet conductor and répétiteur at the Kulturinsel Halle. In 1969 he changed again to the Landestheater as conductor and composer. The classes still exist today in Halle, Dresden, Magdeburg and Zeitz. Children and young people are accompanied there in the creative, compositional handling of sheet music and work together with musicians on their first own pieces.

From 1978 to 1988 he was conductor of the Staatskapelle Halle. From 1988 Hans Jürgen Wenzel worked as a freelance composer and conductor in Berlin and Halle, his special commitment was to New Music.

From 1990 to 1993, he was the successor of Wolfgang Lesser as head of the Verband Deutscher Komponisten (VDK).

Since 2000 he has been Honorary Professor at the Hochschule für Musik Carl Maria von Weber Dresden, and has also worked as a lecturer in composition at home and abroad. Among his students were Annette Schlünz, Uwe Krause, Karsten Gundermann, Michael Flade and Alexander Keuk.

Wenzel died in Halle (Saale) at the age of 70.

Awards and memberships 
 1968 Kunstpreis der Stadt Halle
 1974 
 1974 
 1975 Handel Prize
 1978 
 1979 Patriotic Order of Merit
 1984 Art Prize of the German Democratic Republic
 1986 Ehrennadel der Society for German–Soviet Friendship (in silver)
 1986 Member of the Academy of Arts, Berlin (DDR)

Work

Stage music 
 Fridolin, ballet (Libretto H. Haas), 1965
 Geschichte vom alten Adam, opera (text I. Rähmer after Erwin Strittmatter), 1972/73
 Händel-Pasticcio for 2 actors, mezzo, tape, choir and orchestra 1984–86

Vocal pieces 
 Schwarze Asche, weiße Vögel, Solo cantata for baritone and string orchestra, 1966/67
 DENKMALSTANDORT, chamber oratorio to Prometheus 1982 for speaker, mezzo, bass, child's voice, chamber choir and instruments, texts by various poets, 1981/82

Orchestra and concert works 
 Concerto for flute and orchestra, 1966
 Concerto grosso, 1968
 Concerto for cello and orchestra, 1968/69
 Train Symphony, 1970
 Concerto for large orchestra, 1974
 I. Tardo
 II Pressante
 III Teneraments
 Concerto for violin, string orchestra, harpsichord and percussion, 1974
 Bauhaus music for orchestra, 1977/78
 Concerto for organ and large orchestra, 1979/80
 Mourning and Fire II for chamber orchestra, 1984/85
 Symphony for large orchestra Grief and Fire III, 1985
 Sinfonietta for orchestra, 1985-86

Chamber music 
 1st string quartet, 1960
 2nd string quartet, 1968
 3rd string quartet, 1970
 Dilishanade, Septet, 1975
 12 exhibition music, 1977-86, including the Schult-Musik (1980), the Eröffnungsmusik (1978) and the Trio (1980) for 
 4th string quartet, 1977/81
 Approximation, for flute, clarinet, trumpet, 2 cellos and 2 percussionists, 1980
 Metallophonie I, exhibition music for metal works of different forms, material and sound possibilities as well as 3 flutes, trumpet, viola and cello, 1981
 Double musik I und II, 1983/84 (joint composition with Friedrich Schenker)
 Second Bauhaus music for six wind instruments, 1986
 Inversion, group music for 8 players, 1988

Film scores 
 1971: Zeit der Störche
 1973: 
 1977: Unterwegs nach Atlantis
 1979: 
 1984: Romeo und Julia auf dem Dorfe
 1985: Der Traum vom Elch
 1987: Kindheit

Literature 
 Gerd Belkius: Hans Jürgen Wenzel: Konzert für Violine und Streichorchester. In Musik und Gesellschaft 26 (1976), .
 Metamorphosen dreier Themen Georg Friedrich Händels von Hans Jürgen Wenzel. In Musik und Gesellschaft 28 (1978), 
 Hans Jürgen Wenzel. In Sigrid Neef (with Hermann Neef): Deutsche Oper im 20. Jahrhundert. DDR 1949–1989.] on WorldCat</ref> Lang, Berlin 1992, .
 Wenzel, Hans Jürgen. In Axel Schniederjürgen (ed.): Kürschners Musiker-Handbuch. 5th edition Auflage, Saur Verlag, Munich 2006, .
 Hans Jürgen Wenzel gestorben. In MusikTexte 123 (2009), .
 Bernd-Rainer Barth, Helmut Müller-Enbergs: Wenzel, Hans Jürgen. In  5th edition. vol. 2, Ch. Links, Berlin 2010, .
 List of 30 publications in the German National Library.

References

External links 
 
 Literatur über Hans Jürgen Wenzel in the Bibliography of Music Literature
 Hans Jürgen Wenzel in the MusicSack-Datenbank
 
 

1939 births
2009 deaths
People from Halle (Saale)
20th-century classical composers
German film score composers
German opera composers
Ballet composers
German conductors (music)
Recipients of the Patriotic Order of Merit